Loon Lake, British Columbia may refer to one of a number of lakes in this province of Canada with this precise name or to others with similar names.

Lakes with this name 
 Loon Lake, British Columbia (Lillooet Land District)
 Loon Lake, British Columbia (Alberni Land District) 
 Loon Lake, British Columbia (Queen Charlotte Land District) 
 Loon Lake, British Columbia (Kamloops Division Yale Land District) 
 Loon Lake, British Columbia (Kootenay Land District) 
 Loon Lake, British Columbia (Osoyoos Division Yale Land District) 
 Loon Lake, British Columbia (Kootenay Land District) 
 Loon Lake, British Columbia (Kootenay Land District) 
 Loon Lake, British Columbia (New Westminster Land District)

Lakes with similar names 
 Upper Loon Lake, British Columbia (Lillooet Land District) 
 Big Loon Lake, British Columbia (Range 5 Coast Land District)

References

Lakes of British Columbia